1953 Emperor's Cup Final was the 33rd final of the Emperor's Cup  
football competition. The final was played at Nishikyogoku Athletic Stadium in Kyoto on May 5, 1953. All Kwangaku won the championship.

Overview
All Kwangaku won the championship, by defeating Osaka Club 5–4. All Kwangaku was featured a squad consisting of Ryuzo Hiraki, Shigeo Sugimoto, Masanori Tokita, Arawa Kimura and Takashi Tokuhiro. Osaka Club was featured a squad consisting of Taizo Kawamoto, Toshio Iwatani, Taro Kagawa and Osamu Yamaji.

Match details

See also
1953 Emperor's Cup

References

Emperor's Cup
Emperor's Cup Final
Emperor's Cup Final